As Long as There's Music is an album by pianist Cedar Walton which was recorded in 1990 and first released on the Muse label in 1993.

Reception 

In his review on Allmusic, David R. Adler states "While the playing on the album is excellent, the production lacks the warmth of some of Walton's earlier sessions".

Track listing 
All compositions by Cedar Walton except where noted.
 "Young and Foolish" (Albert Hague, Arnold B. Horwitt) – 6:01
 "Meaning of the Blues" (Bobby Troup, Leah Worth) – 9:24
 "I'm Not So Sure" – 6:01
 "Ground Work" – 6:25
 "Newest Blues" – 5:39
 "Pannonica" (Thelonious Monk) – 8:57
 "As Long as There's Music" (Jule Styne, Sammy Cahn) – 6:27
 "Voices Deep Within" – 9:37

Personnel 
Cedar Walton – piano
Terence Blanchard – trumpet
Jesse Davis – alto saxophone
David Williams – bass
Billy Higgins – drums

References 

Cedar Walton albums
1993 albums
Muse Records albums
Albums recorded at Van Gelder Studio